Poręby Wolskie  is a village in the administrative district of Gmina Raniżów, within Kolbuszowa County, Subcarpathian Voivodeship, in south-eastern Poland.

The village has a population of 328.

References

Villages in Kolbuszowa County